The 1888 Wake Forest Baptists football team was an American football team that represented Wake Forest College during the 1888 college football season. In its first year of intercollegiate football, the team defeated North Carolina by a 6–4 score in a game played on October 18, 1888, at the State Fair Grounds in Raleigh, North Carolina. After the game, The News & Observer wrote:"Decidedly one of the most interesting features of the whole fair was the game of foot ball yesterday between Wake Forest and Chapel Hill, resulting in a victory for Wake Forest. The game was exciting and was played by excellent teams on both sides.  It was witnessed by a tremendous crowd.  The players were uniformed and were a skilled and active set of boys."

W. C. Dowd was the coach of the Wake Forest team.  The game was the first intercollegiate football game played in the state of North Carolina.  The game was also the first in the history of the North Carolina Tar Heels football program.

Schedule

References

Wake Forest
Wake Forest Demon Deacons football seasons
College football undefeated seasons
Wake Forest Baptists football